Marisora is a genus of skinks. They are found in Mexico, Central America and some Caribbean islands.

Species
The following 13 species, listed alphabetically by specific name, are recognized as being valid:

Marisora alliacea (Cope, 1875) 
Marisora aquilonaria McCranie, Matthews, & Hedges, 2020 – Southern Sierra Madre skink
Marisora aurulae Hedges & Conn, 2012 – Lesser Windward skink 
Marisora berengerae – San Andrés skink
Marisora brachypoda (Taylor, 1956) 
Marisora falconensis (Mijares-Urrutia & Arends, 1997) 
Marisora lineola McCranie, Matthews, & Hedges, 2020 – Mayan skink
Marisora magnacornae Hedges & Conn, 2012 – Corn Island skink
Marisora pergravis  – Providencia skink
Marisora roatanae Hedges & Conn, 2012 – Roatán skink
Marisora syntoma McCranie, Matthews, & Hedges, 2020 – Tehuantepec skink
Marisora unimarginata (Cope, 1862) – Central American mabuya
Marisora urtica McCranie, Matthews, & Hedges, 2020 – Fonseca Islands skink

Nota bene: A binomial authority in parentheses indicates that the species was originally described in a genus other than Marisora.

References

 
Lizard genera
Taxa named by Stephen Blair Hedges
Taxa named by Caitlin E. Conn